The Carson City team was a minor league baseball team based in Carson City, Nevada in 1907. The team moniker was noted to be the "Capitals", as Carson City played the 1907 season as members of the Independent level Nevada State League. The 1907 Carson City team is the only minor league team hosted in Carson City to date.

History
One of the earliest organized baseball clubs was the 1870 Carson City Silver Star ballclub. Another ballclub of the early era was the 1874 Carson City Silver Stars.

Carson City was a charter member of the 1907 Nevada State League, which began minor league play in the 1907 season, operating as an Independent four–team league. The Nevada State League president was John T. Powers, who later served as president of the Federal League. The 1907 Nevada State League formed with charter franchises in Carson City, Nevada, Goldfield, Nevada, Reno, Nevada and Tonopah, Nevada.

The Nevada State League had been structured with John T. Powers serving as league president and Bert Ulmer as treasurer. On July 6, 1907 a meeting was conducted at the office of Senator Boyd, where the Nevada State League Board of Directors was formed. The directors were Ben Rosenthal of Goldfield, Senator James T. Boyd of Reno, J.P Merder of Carson City and Thomas Kendall of Tonopah. Powers had previously served as president of the Wisconsin State League. Ulmer was an owner of the Elite Saloon in Goldfield. James T. Boyd was a member of the Nevada State Senate from 1906 to 1910. Rosenthal was Goldfield County commissioner. Kendall was a mining pioneer, owner of the Kendall Mine and a founder of Toonpah.

Research indicates the Carson City franchise was called the Carson City "Capitals". The other league members were noted to be called the Goldfield "Miners", Reno "Mudhens" and Tonopah "Mollycoddlers". Unofficial records place Carson City in 2nd place with a 7–4–1 record, behind the 1st place Goldfield "Miners", who had a 9–5 record. They were followed by the Tonopah "Mollycoddlers" at 3–6 and the Reno "Mudhens" with a  3–7–1 record. It is noted that Reno disbanded on July 15, 1907 and it is possible the rest of the league, Carson City included, followed suit, as only three teams would have remained. Carson City, Nevada has not hosted another minor league team.

The ballpark
The exact name and location of the Carson City ballpark in 1907 is unknown.

Timeline

Year–by–year records

Notable alumni
No roster information for Carson City in 1907 is known.

References

External links
Carson City 1907- Baseball Reference

Defunct minor league baseball teams
Culture of Carson City, Nevada
Professional baseball teams in Nevada
Defunct baseball teams in Nevada
Baseball teams established in 1907
Baseball teams disestablished in 1907
1907 disestablishments in Nevada
1907 establishments in Nevada